The 1999–2000 season was the 77th season in the existence of Elche CF and the club's first season back in the second division of Spanish football. The season covered the period from 1 July 1999 to 30 June 2000.

Pre-season and friendlies

Competitions

Overall record

La Liga

League table

Results summary

Results by round

Matches

Source:

Copa del Rey

Preliminary round

References

Elche CF seasons
Elche